Sophia Agranovich (Russian: София Агранович; Ukrainian: Софія Агранович) is a Soviet-born American classical concert pianist, Centaur Records recording artist, music educator and artistic director. She holds Bachelor and Master degrees from the Juilliard School, where she taught piano as a teaching fellow. She continued her doctoral studies at Teachers College, Columbia University. Her live performances and discography have won top international awards and critical acclaim. Her albums are charting in top 10 across all musical genres on One World Music Radio and on World Top Radio Airplay Charts. A Steinway Artist, she is concertizing at major venues worldwide, and has been described by Fanfare Magazine as "a bold, daring pianist in the tradition of the Golden Age Romantics" and praised by the American Record Guide for her "magnificent shading and superior musicianship."

Biography

Early life and music education 

Sophia Agranovich was born in Chernivtsi, Ukrainian SSR, Soviet Union (modern-day Ukraine). Her father was a dentist and her mother was an instructor of the English language and her first piano teacher. Agranovich began formal piano lessons at age five. At six she was accepted to Chernivtsi School of Music and gave her first public concert. Her teachers were Anna Stolyarevich and Alexander Edelmann (both peers of Vladimir Horowitz and disciples of Felix Blumenfeld and Heinrich Neuhaus). At age 10 Agranovich won the Ukrainian Young Artists Competition (now known as the Mykola Lysenko International Music Competition), as that year's youngest participant. Her concerts were broadcast on national TV and radio stations.

Agranovich graduated from Chernivtsi School of Music in 1971. After immigrating with her family to the United States at age 15, Agranovich entered The Juilliard School Pre-College in New York City on a full scholarship in the class of Professor Sascha Gorodnitzki. Agranovich also studied with Nadia Reisenberg. She graduated from Juilliard with a Bachelor of Music degree in 1977 and a Master of Music degree in 1978. Agranovich won the Bergen Philharmonic Competition in 1979. She was awarded a fellowship and taught piano minor at Juilliard. Agranovich continued her academic pursuits at Teachers College, Columbia University, taking Doctor of Philosophy coursework in Music Education, Music Theory and Music History from 1980 to 1981.

Hiatus from music 
Agranovich paused her musical career in the 1980s to raise a family and to pursue an additional career in Information Technology. Having earned a certification in Computer Science from the Empire Technical School in New York City in 1981, her career in technology developed with her employment as a systems analyst for the Metropolitan Life Insurance Company in 1985 (where she received the Presidential Quality Award for Computer Systems Design and Support), and later a senior programmer/analyst at Merrill Lynch in 1987. She was ultimately promoted to project manager/assistant vice president in 1995 and vice president in 2001.

In 2008, Agranovich retired from her IT career and studied naturopathy, traditional Indian medicine and traditional Chinese medicine. In 2008 she received certifications from National Exercise and Sports Trainers Association/Spencer Institute and American Association of Drugless Practitioners in Yoga, Pilates, and other holistic disciplines. From 2009 to 2012 she taught Yoga and Pilates.

Music career 
In 2008, Agranovich restarted her professional musical career as a concert pianist, recording artist, music educator and program director. She has performed in the United States, Europe, Israel, and Canada, and was invited to perform in China. In 2017 she gave 2-hour solo recitals at the Pennautier Festival and Juan-les-Pins in France where she premiered Quatre préludes en hommage a Chopin, Op. 162 dedicated to her by the French composer Françoise Choveaux. Other premieres included Roger Stubblefield's Sonata for clarinet and piano and Nocturne for viola and piano. She gave concerts at David Geffen (former Avery Fisher) Hall, Bruno Walter Auditorium and Paul Hall at Lincoln Center, Carnegie Weill Recital Hall, Merkin Concert Hall, Roerich and Metropolitan museums, Steinway Hall and Galleries, Bargemusic, Tenri Cultural Institute, Polish Cultural Foundation, Lambert Castle, Watchung Arts Center, Salle Cortot, Ehrbarsaal and Kaiser Hall.

Other performance venues include numerous colleges and universities, such as the New Jersey Institute of Technology, Rubin Academy of Music, Pyotr Tchaikovsky National Music Academy of Ukraine and Lviv State Conservatory. She has collaborated with Mark Peskanov, Shlomo Mintz, Christopher Collins Lee, Andrew Litton, Alexander Mishnaevski, Gregory Singer, Brett Deubner, Andrew Lamy, Andatole Wieck, Rupam Sarmah, Kathleen Supové, award-winning Emmy, Grammy, and Billboard top ten musical artists, and members of the major orchestras.

Agranovich released ten albums from 2010 through 2022, including seven on Centaur Records, consisting primarily of virtuoso piano repertoire of the Romantic era. She is also an author of her albums' liner notes.

Her performances are broadcast in Brazil on Universidade FM 106.9, "Company of the Music", in Canada on CKWR "Women in Music," Berlin, Munich, Rome, New Zealand, London, Tokyo, Osaka, Paris, Tel-Aviv, and in New York area on WWFM "Between the Keys" with Jed Distler and "Piano Matters" with David Dubal, WMNR "Friday Evenings with Will Duchon", NPR WLPR-FM "Art on the Air",  WQXR "Reflections from the Keyboard" with David Dubal, and live at WQXR Greene Space.

Sophia Agranovich is on the Steinway Artists roster, and is listed annually in Marquis Who’s Who in America and Who’s Who in the World. She is a voting member of NARAS, GrammyU® mentor, and an active member of numerous professional music organizations, including American Liszt Society, College Music Society, and Leschetizky Association. Additionally she served on the  board of NJMTA affiliated with Music Teachers National Association, and is an Artistic Director of "Classicals at the Circle" music series at the Watchung Arts Center. and a program chair and board member of Music Educators Association of New Jersey.

Pedagogy 
Sophia Agranovich is a music educator and has received numerous pedagogy awards. She conducts master classes and lectures, adjudicates competitions, prepares students for exams and auditions, coaches professional musicians, and maintains a private teaching studio.

Agranovich's students have won various awards and had been accepted to notable music schools, including the Juilliard School, Mannes School of Music, Manhattan School of Music and New York University, among others. Her students have performed at the Carnegie Weill Recital Hall, Kennedy Center for the Performing Arts, Merkin Hall, Alice Tully Hall, Lincoln Center, Kimmel Center, Tenri Cultural Institute, Steinway Hall, Watchung Arts Center, Polish Cultural Foundation, and Polish Embassy in New York. They also played in Italy, France, Austria, Poland, China and at various colleges, universities and libraries. Their performances were broadcast on radio and TV, including WWFM "Kids on Keys" with Jed Distler and WQXR "Young Artists Showcase" with Robert Sherman.

Awards and honors 
 2023: Steinway & Sons - Steinway Top Teacher Award
 2023: One Earth Awards - Best Classical Music Recording, Gold Winner
 2023: One World Music Radio - Nominated for the Best Classical Album 2022
 2022: Indie Music Channel - Winner, Best Classical Recording
 2022: The 2022 Want List (Best Recordings), Fanfare Magazine
 2022: The Radio Music Awards - Best Classical Artist, Best Classical Recording, Best Instrumental Recording
 2022: Clouzine International Music Awards - Best Classical Album, Fall 2022
 2022: Global Music Awards, 2 Silver Medals for Outstanding Achievement
 2022: LIT International Talent Awards, Fall 2022 - Platinum: Best Female Artist and Best Classical Music; Gold: Best Instrumental Music and Best Performance
 2022: LIT International Talent Awards, Spring 2022 - Platinum: Best Classical Pianist and Best Instrumental Artist; Gold: Best Female Instrumental Artist; Instrumentalist of the Year
 2022: One World Music Radio - Best Classical Album 2021
 2022: The American Prize -  Winner, Piano Solo, 2nd place; Finalist, Virtual Performance
 2022: Nomination for the Best Classical Recording and Album of the Year, Indie Music Channel
 2021: World Top Radio Airplay Charts - July 2021-December 2021
 2021: Global Music Awards, 2 Silver Medals for Outstanding Achievement

 2021: Clouzine International Music Awards, 2 Best Classical Albums (Spring and Fall 2021)
 2019: Marquis Who's Who, Top Music Educators and Top Professionals Awards
 2018: Indie Music Channel, Indie Music Hall of Fame
 2018: Global Music Awards, 2 Silver Medals for Outstanding Achievement
 2018: Clouzine International Music Awards, Best Classical Piano Album (Spring 2018)
2018: The Radio Music Awards, Best Classical Female Artist
2018: Mainly Piano, 2018 Favorites and Picks – Chopin and Liszt: Piano Works
 2017: Marquis Who’s Who, Albert Nelson Marquis Lifetime Achievement Award
 2017: Global Music Awards, 3 Gold Medals: Classical Piano Solo, New Release, Album
 2017: Global Music Awards, Top 10 albums across all the genres
 2016: The American Prize; Finalist
2016: Prestige Music Awards, 2 Gold Medals

 2016: Global Music Awards, 4 Silver Medals for Outstanding Achievement
2012: Steinway Artist Roster
1986: Metropolitan Life Insurance, Presidential Quality Award for Computer Systems Design and Support 
1980: Juilliard School, Teaching Fellowship
1979: Bergen Philharmonic Competition, 1st Place Winner, Piano 
1966: Ukrainian Young Artists Competition (now known as Mykola Lysenko International Music Competition), 1st Place Winner, Piano

Discography

Interviews and discussions 
WWFM Classical Network, WWPJ, WWNJ, WWCJ "Cadenza" with David Osenbeg, February 17, 2023
NPR Lakeshore Public Radio, "Art on the Air" - Interview, January 2023
Fanfare Magazine – Interview; November–December 2022
"Mixing It with Nicki Kris"- podcast discussion and performance, October 2022
The Ark of Music - Interview, September 2022
"Chatting with Nat' podcast with Natalie Jean on SIM radio network -  discussion and performance, September 2022
"Content vs. Quantity!" -  Lite Lounge with Dimitri K. - August 21, 2022 - Interview and Album Show
"Mixing It with Nicki Kris"- podcast discussion and performance, April 2022 
"Music Matters"  –  "Concert Pianist on Maintaining Inspiration" Live with Maestro Jason Tramm  – discussion and performance, October 2021
 "Chatting with Nat' podcast with Natalie Jean on SIM radio network-  discussion and performance – September 2021
One World Music Radio – "Artist in Profile"; July 2021
Mainly Piano  – interview;  July 2021
Fanfare Magazine – Interview; March–April 2021 
Radio Fantastica – discussion and performance; February 2021
Video Interview with Maestro Daniel Kepl; January 2019
Fanfare Magazine – Interview; July–August 2018
Fanfare Magazine – Interview; May–June 2017
Fanfare Magazine – Interview; March–April 2015
Fanfare Magazine – Interview; November–December 2012
 Fanfare Magazine – Interview; March–April 2012

Reviews 

 American Record Guide – reviews in the issues March–April 2021 P. 45-46, November–December 2012 P. 152, July–August 2014 P. 80-81, July–August 2015, March–April 2016, March–April 2017, July–August 2021 (PDF, fee required)
 The Whole Note: November 1 - December 13, 2022, Vol. 28, issue 2, P. 53-54
Mainly Piano – November 2018, October 2020, February 2021, August 2022, September 9, 2022
Contemporary Fusion Reviews - September, 2022
One World Music Radio - 2021, 2022
The Ark of Music - September 13, 2022 and September 21, 2022
 Art Music Lounge – March 2016, October 2016, January 2021
Clouzine Magazine – Fall 2018, Spring 2021 – P.14, Fall 2021
Atlanta Audio Club – May 2018, December 2020
Performing Arts Review – January 2017 – video review
LaDepeche, France – August 2017
 L’Independant, France – July 2017
 Audiophile Audition - April, 2014
 Fanfare Magazine – all the review articles for Sophia Agranovich

References

External links

Official website
Official Youtube channel 
Sophia Agranovich on AllMusic, AppleMusic, Discogs

Living people
Women classical pianists
20th-century American women pianists
20th-century American pianists
21st-century classical pianists
21st-century American women pianists
21st-century American pianists
American classical pianists
Ukrainian classical pianists
Ukrainian women pianists
Jewish women musicians
Jewish Ukrainian musicians
Ukrainian emigrants to the United States
Jewish American musicians
Musicians from Chernivtsi
Juilliard School alumni
Women music educators
American music educators
Soviet classical pianists
Year of birth missing (living people)
American people of Ukrainian-Jewish descent
Jewish classical pianists
Centaur Records artists